HMS Louis  was a  built for the British Royal Navy during the 1910s. She participated in the Dardanelles campaign, during which she was wrecked in Suvla Bay in 1915.

Description
The Laforey class were improved and faster versions of the preceding . They displaced . Louis was powered by two Brown-Curtis direct-drive steam turbines, each driving one propeller shaft, using steam provided by four Yarrow boilers. The ships' complement was 74 officers and ratings.

The ships were armed with three single QF  Mark IV guns and two QF 1.5-pounder (37 mm) anti-aircraft guns. These latter guns were later replaced by a pair of QF 2-pounder (40 mm) "pom-pom" anti-aircraft guns. The ships were also fitted with two above-water twin mounts for  torpedoes. They were equipped with rails to carry four Vickers Elia Mk IV mines, although these rails were never used.

Construction and service

Laid down as Talisman, the ship was renamed on 30 September 1913 to Louis before being launched. Built by Fairfield Shipbuilding and Engineering Company, Govan (Yard No 491) and launched 30 December 1913, she was wrecked in Suvla Bay on 31 October 1915 during the Dardanelles campaign. The wreck was destroyed by Ottoman coastal artillery.

Notes

Bibliography

External links
 

 

1913 ships
Ships built on the River Clyde
Laforey-class destroyers (1913)
Gallipoli campaign
Maritime incidents in 1915
World War I shipwrecks in the Aegean Sea